Bradford is a city in West Yorkshire, England.

Bradford may also refer to:

Places

In Canada 
 Bradford, Ontario

In New Zealand 
 Bradford, New Zealand, a suburb of Dunedin

In Sierra Leone 

 Bradford, Sierra Leone

In the United Kingdom
 City of Bradford, a metropolitan district of West Yorkshire, England
 Bradford, Cornwall, England
 Bradford, Derbyshire, a location in England
 Bradford, Devon, England
 Bradford, Manchester, a district and electoral ward in the city of Manchester, England, two miles north east of the city centre
 Bradford, Adderstone with Lucker, Northumberland, England, near Wooler
 Bradford, Belsay, in Belsay, Northumberland, England, near Morpeth
 Bradford, West Yorkshire, the namesake city, 1 of 7 post towns, and the largest of the many towns and villages which make up the City of Bradford
 Bradford-on-Avon, a town in Wiltshire
 Bradford-on-Tone, Somerset
 West Bradford, Lancashire

In the United States 
 Bradford, Alabama, an unincorporated community
 Bradford, Arkansas
 Bradford, Illinois
 Bradford, Indiana
 Bradford, Iowa (disambiguation), multiple places
 Bradford, Kansas
 Bradford, Kentucky
 Bradford, Maine
 Bradford, Massachusetts (now part of Haverhill)
 Bradford, New Hampshire, a New England town
 Bradford (CDP), New Hampshire, the main village in the town
 Bradford, New York
 Bradford, Ohio
 Bradford, Pennsylvania
 Bradford, Rhode Island
 Bradford, Tennessee
 Bradford, Texas
 Bradford, Vermont
 Bradford, Wisconsin
 Bradford County, Florida
 Bradford County, Pennsylvania
 Bradford Township, Minnesota (disambiguation)
 Bradford Township, Pennsylvania (disambiguation)
 Bradford Plaza, a shopping center in West Chester, Pennsylvania
 Bradford Island, California

People and fictional characters 
 Bradford (name), a list of people and fictional characters with the given name or surname
 Earl of Bradford, two titles, one in the Peerage of England and one in the Peerage of the United Kingdom

Education 
 University of Bradford, a university in Bradford, West Yorkshire, England
 Bradford College, a college in Bradford, West Yorkshire, England
 Bradford College (United States), a now-defunct college in Haverhill, Massachusetts, USA

Sports teams 
 Bradford Bulls, formerly Bradford Northern, rugby league team from Bradford, West Yorkshire, England
 Bradford City A.F.C., Football League team from Bradford, West Yorkshire, England
 Bradford (Park Avenue) A.F.C., former Football League and non-league team from Bradford, West Yorkshire, England
 Bradford Town F.C., non-league football team from Bradford-on-Avon, Wiltshire, England

Transportation
 Bradford Forster Square railway station, railway station in Bradford, West Yorkshire, England
Bradford GO Station, in Bradford, Ontario, Canada
Bradford Interchange, bus and railway station in Bradford, West Yorkshire, England
 Bradford station, MBTA station in Bradford, Massachusetts, United States

Other uses 
 Bradford (band), a late eighties indie band from Blackburn, Lancashire, England
 Bradford (computer program), that helped to launch the shareware movement
 Bradford Books, a publishing imprint of MIT Press
 Another name for a martini, that has been shaken rather than stirred
 Bradford pear, a cultivar of Callery pear popular as an urban ornamental tree

See also 
 Bradford Airport (disambiguation)
 Bradford & Bingley plc, a British bank
 Bradford White, an American manufacturer of water heaters
 Bradford system, method of assessing quality of wool
 Bradford's law (bibliometrics), a pattern that estimates the exponentially diminishing returns of extending a search for references in science journals
 Bradford protein assay, a spectroscopic procedure to measure the concentration of protein in solution